Valo is a surname. Notable people with the surname include:

Elmer Valo (1921–1998), American baseball player
Jesse Valo (born 1984), Finnish kickboxer and musician, former member of Iconcrash
Ville Valo (born 1976), Finnish musician

Other
Valo, an album by Finnish rock band Yö
 VALO-CD, a distribution of open-source software on a CD for Microsoft Windows
 Adelaide 500 also known as Clipsal 500; a race in Adelaide.

See also 
 Vallo (disambiguation)
 Valor (disambiguation)
 Valon

 Val (disambiguation)

 Vola (disambiguation)
 Volo (disambiguation)
 Vala (disambiguation)